Kerala Blasters FC is an Indian professional football club that competes in the Indian Super League, the top-tier of Indian football. The club was established on 27 May 2014 and began their first professional season a few months later in October 2014. They play their home matches at the Jawaharlal Nehru Stadium, Kochi.

Players
As of 3 March 2023

 The List Includes All The Players Registered Under A Kerala Blasters FC Contract. Some Players Might Not Have Featured In A Professional Game For The Club

Notable foreign internationals

 David James (2014)
 Iain Hume (2014 & 2017-2018)
 Carlos Marchena (2015) 
 Aaron Hughes (2016–2017)
 Duckens Nazon (2016–2017)
 Wes Brown (2017–2018) 
 Dimitar Berbatov (2017–2018) 
 Bartholomew Ogbeche (2019–2020)
 Bakary Koné (2020–2021) 
 Marko Lešković (2021–present)

By nationality
As of 31 January 2023

All Players

Club captains

See also
Kerala Blasters
List of Kerala Blasters FC records and statistics
List of Kerala Blasters FC managers
Kerala Blasters FC results by opponent
List of Kerala Blasters FC Seasons
Kerala Blasters FC Reserves and Academy

References

Kerala Blasters FC

Players
Kerala Blasters FC
Association football player non-biographical articles